Monalocoris is a genus of plant bugs in the family Miridae. There are about 19 described species in Monalocoris.

Species
These 19 species belong to the genus Monalocoris:

 Monalocoris amamianus Yasunaga, 2000
 Monalocoris americanus Wagner & Slater, 1952
 Monalocoris bipunctipennis Walker, 1873
 Monalocoris carioca Carvalho & Gomes, 1971
 Monalocoris eminulus (Distant, 1893)
 Monalocoris filicis (Linnaeus, 1758)
 Monalocoris flaviceps (Poppius, 1915)
 Monalocoris fulviscutellatus Hu & Zheng, 2003
 Monalocoris minutus (Reuter, 1907)
 Monalocoris montanus (Distant, 1913)
 Monalocoris neotropicalis Carvalho & Gomes, 1969
 Monalocoris nigrocollaris Carvalho, 1989
 Monalocoris nigroflavis Hu & Zheng, 2003
 Monalocoris nigrus Carvalho, 1981
 Monalocoris ochraceus Hu & Zheng, 2003
 Monalocoris pallidiceps (Reuter, 1907)
 Monalocoris pallipes Carvalho, 1981
 Monalocoris parvulus (Reuter, 1881)
 Monalocoris punctipennis Linnavuori, 1975

References

Further reading

External links

 

Miridae genera
Bryocorini
Articles created by Qbugbot